Venezillo parvus is a species of woodlouse in the family Armadillidae. It is found in North America and Europe.

References

External links

 

Isopoda
Articles created by Qbugbot
Crustaceans described in 1885